Coelogyne pulchella is a species of orchid.

References 

pulchella